is a retired Japanese Nordic combined skier. He competed at the 1972 and 1976 Winter Olympics and placed fifth and 21st, respectively.

After retiring from competitions Katsuro was offered a job as a coach affiliated with his company. He refused and tried to become an independent coach, but failed, and later took odd jobs at bars and golf courses.

References

External links

Nordic combined skiers at the 1972 Winter Olympics
Nordic combined skiers at the 1976 Winter Olympics
Japanese male Nordic combined skiers
1949 births
Living people
Olympic Nordic combined skiers of Japan